Neshoba: The Price of Freedom is a 2008 documentary film about events and attitudes in Neshoba County, Mississippi, especially the 1964 murders of Chaney, Goodman, and Schwerner. The film premiered at the 2008 Indie Memphis Film Festival, where it won the Jury Award for Best Documentary.

Synopsis
Neshoba explores the history and changing racial attitudes of Neshoba County, Mississippi four decades after the murders of James Chaney, Andrew Goodman, and Michael Schwerner during Freedom Summer. The film captures the trial of Edgar Ray Killen, who granted the filmmakers "extraordinary access".

Awards 
 Best Documentary – Boston Film Festival
 Best Political Documentary & Best Directors – New York International Independent Film and Video Festival
 Best Documentary – Indie Memphis Film Festival
 Best Documentary – Ft. Lauderdale International Film Festival
 Best Mississippi Film – Oxford Film Festival
Best Overall Film – Texas Black Film Festival
Best Documentary – Texas Black Film Festival
Best Human Rights Film – Canada International Film Festival
Best Documentary – Teaneck International Film Festival
Best Film – Berlin Black International Film Festival
Special Jury Award – WorldFest-Houston International Film Festival
Special Jury Award – Monaco Film Festival
Audience Award – Albuquerque Film Festival
Humanitas Prize Nominee
American Documentary Showcase – Kenya International Film Festival

Reception
Though critical of certain production elements, Variety praised Neshoba as "a disturbing peek at how little some people have changed, as well as an inspiring portrait of others' determination to see crime punished at last".

See also
 Civil rights movement in popular culture

References

External links 
 
 
 

2008 films
Documentary films about the civil rights movement
Documentary films about racism in the United States
2008 documentary films
Neshoba County, Mississippi
Films shot in Mississippi
Documentary films about United States history
Civil rights movement in popular culture
2000s English-language films
2000s American films